The Aspy River  is a river on northeastern Cape Breton Island which rises in the Cape Breton Highlands and empties into Aspy Bay. This geological fault is thought to be a part of the Cabot Fault (Newfoundland)/ Great Glen Fault (Scotland) system of Avalonia.

It is believed by some sources that John Cabot landed at Aspy Bay in 1497. In 1856, a submarine cable was laid across the Cabot Strait from Aspy Bay to Newfoundland establishing a telegraph link between St. John's, Newfoundland and New York City.

A dirt road in Cape Breton Highlands National Park leads to the Beulach Ban falls on the North Aspy River. "Beulach Ban" is Gaelic for "white gorge".

See also
 List of rivers of Nova Scotia

References

External links 
  John Cabot memorial at Aspy Bay Cape Breton Island, Nova Scotia

Rivers of Nova Scotia
Landforms of Victoria County, Nova Scotia
Landforms of Inverness County, Nova Scotia